Anchylobela holophaea is a species of snout moth in the genus Anchylobela. It was described by Alfred Jefferis Turner in 1905, and is known from northern Australia.

References

Moths described in 1905
Anerastiini
Moths of Australia